Go Youn-jung (born on April 22, 1996) is a South Korean model and actress signed under MAA. She made her acting debut in the television series He Is Psychometric (2019) and gained recognition for her supporting role in the Netflix series Sweet Home (2020). She is also known for her works in television dramas Law School (2021) and Alchemy of Souls (2022), as well as the film Hunt (2022).

Early life
She was born on April 22, 1996, in Seoul, South Korea. She attended Seoul Women's University to study Contemporary Art.

Career

Career beginnings
After she graduated from Seoul Women's University, she joined MAA Entertainment as a model and actress. She first did modeling for various commercials of Sports, Nike, Giorgio Armani, Ritz Crackers and several commercials for KT.

2019–present: Acting debut
In 2019, after expressing interest and talent in acting, she made her acting debut in the television series He Is Psychometric, playing Kim So-hyun. 

In 2020, she made a highly praised cameo in the Korean Netflix television series The School Nurse Files, and in the same year, she appeared in the smash hit Netflix television series Sweet Home as Park Yu-ri, a sad caretaker with a tragic past. This role led to additional praise and acknowledgement. 

In 2021, she starred as Jeon Yeseul in Law School and earned acknowledgment for her portrayal of a law student suffering from dating violence. 

In 2022, she made her film debut in the action thriller Hunt. The same year, she joined tvN period fantasy series Alchemy of Souls, making a brief appearance as skilled assassin Nak-su in Part 1. In December 2022, she returned as the female lead in the Part 2 of the series – Alchemy of Souls: Light and Shadow, where she played an amnesiac priestess Jin Bu-yeon alongside Lee Jae-wook.

Filmography

Film

Television series

Web series

Awards and nominations

References

External links
 
 

1996 births
Living people
21st-century South Korean actresses
South Korean female models
South Korean film actresses
South Korean television actresses
South Korean web series actresses
Seoul Women's University alumni